The men's 10,000 metres was the longest of the seven men's track races in the Athletics at the 1964 Summer Olympics program in Tokyo.  It was held on 14 October.  38 athletes from 23 nations entered, with 6 more not starting the event. The event was held as a single heat.

Results

Final
World record holder Ron Clarke of Australia set the tone of the race. His tactic of surging every other lap appeared to be working. Halfway through the race, only five runners were still with Clarke: Mohammed Gammoudi of Tunisia, Mamo Wolde of Ethiopia, Barry Magee of New Zealand, Kokichi Tsuburaya of Japan, and Billy Mills of the United States. Magee and Tsuburaya, the local favorite, lost contact first, then Wolde. With two laps to go, only two runners were still with Clarke. On paper, it seemed to be Clarke's race. He had run a world record time of 28:15.6 while neither Gammoudi nor Mills had ever run under 29 minutes.

Mills and Clarke were running together with Gammoudi right behind as they entered the final lap.
They were lapping other runners and, down the backstretch, Clarke was boxed in. He pushed Mills once, then again. Then Gammoudi pushed his way between them both and surged into the lead as they rounded the final curve. Clarke recovered and began chasing Gammoudi while Mills appeared to be too far back to be in contention. Clarke failed to catch Gammoudi, but Mills pulled out to lane 4 and sprinted past them both. His winning time of 28:24.4 was almost 50 seconds faster than he had run before and set a new Olympic record for the event. No American had ever before won the 10,000 m, nor has any other American come seriously close until Galen Rupp took the silver at the 2012 London Olympics.

American television viewers were able to hear the surprise and drama as NBC expert analyst Dick Bank screamed, "Look at Mills, look at Mills" over the more sedate play-by-play announcer Bud Palmer, who seemed to miss what was unfolding.  For bringing that drama to the coverage, Bank was fired.

The top four runners beat the standing Olympic record.

References

Athletics at the 1964 Summer Olympics
10,000 metres at the Olympics
Men's events at the 1964 Summer Olympics